Colchester Public Schools, also known as Colchester School District, is a school district in Colchester, Connecticut, United States.

Schools
The district operates the following schools:
 Bacon Academy
 William J. Johnston Middle School
 Jack Jackter Intermediate School
 Colchester Elementary School

References

External links

Colchester, Connecticut
School districts in Connecticut
Education in New London County, Connecticut